The Braintree branch line is a railway branch line in the East of England that diverges from the Great Eastern Main Line at  and runs north-west to . The line is part of Network Rail Strategic Route 7, SRS 07.06, and is classified as a London and South-East commuter line.

The stations and all services are currently operated by Greater Anglia. As of 2019 the typical off-peak weekday service-frequency is one train per hour in each direction. The timetabled journey time between Witham and Braintree is 16 minutes.

History 

Originally constructed from Maldon to  via , only the line from Braintree to Witham remains open. The line was proposed by the Maldon, Witham & Braintree Railway (MWBR) and given royal assent in June 1846. The MWBR was subsequently  purchased by the Eastern Counties Railway (ECR), and the line opened in 1848.

The section from Maldon to Witham was constructed as double-track, however one track was lifted during the period of the Crimean War (1854–56) and sold to the War Office.

The Bishop's Stortford–Braintree branch line, built by the Great Eastern Railway (GER), was opened in 1869. This created a route from Maldon through to the West Anglia Main Line.

The line was extended from Maldon to Woodham Ferrers in 1889.

In 1923, both lines became part of the London and North Eastern Railway (LNER).

The Bishop's Stortford–Braintree branch closed to passenger traffic in 1952 and then to freight in 1971. The section from Maldon East and Heybridge to Witham was closed to passengers following the Beeching cuts to the railways in 1964, although goods services on that section continued until 1966. Conversely, the Witham-Braintree section saw an upsurge in passengers after a railbus was tried in the early 1960s, which was then replaced by a diesel multiple unit.

The franchise for the line is currently held by Greater Anglia.

Infrastructure 
The line is single-track throughout and the route is electrified at 25 kV AC.

Services are formed of  units. The first entered service on 16 December 2020.

Most of the former railway alignment between just east of Bishops Stortford and Braintree has been preserved, and is managed by Essex County Council as the Flitch Way linear park. Two local groups volunteer to improve the site and campaign for improvements.

Stations 

References

External links 

Maldon, Witham & Braintree Railway Co - 1845–50: promoters', shareholders' and directors' minutes, misc accounts, contracts, plans, letters and papers

Rail transport in Essex
Railway lines in the East of England
EA 1070
Railway companies established in 1846
Railway lines opened in 1848
Standard gauge railways in England
1846 establishments in England